This article is a list of diseases of rice (Oryza sativa). Diseases have historically been one of the major causes of rice shortages.

Bacterial diseases

Fungal diseases

Viruses

Rice black-streaked dwarf virus
Rice bunchy stunt virus
Rice dwarf virus
Rice gall dwarf virus
Rice giallume virus
Rice grassy stunt virus
Rice hoja blanca tenuivirus
Rice necrosis mosaic virus
Rice ragged stunt virus
Rice stripe necrosis virus
Rice stripe tenuivirus
Rice transitory yellowing virus
Rice tungro bacilliform virus - see Tungro below
Rice tungro spherical virus - see Tungro below
Rice yellow mottle virus

Miscellaneous diseases and disorders

See also 
 List of rice varieties

References

External links
Common Names of Diseases, The American Phytopathological Society
 Straighthead of rice and its control hosted by the UNT Government Documents Department

Rice